Anna Iwaszkiewicz,  (pen name: Adam Podkowiński, 1897–1979), was a Polish writer and translator, wife of the writer Jarosław Iwaszkiewicz.

Early years 
When Anna was four years old, her mother Jadwiga Stankiewicz left her and her father, wealthy industrialist Stanisław Wilhelm Lilpop, for the pianist Józef Śliwiński. From then on, her father and aunt Aniela Pilawitz brought her up, while her mother was denied any contact with Anna. From 1915 to 1918, she stayed with her father in Russia, particularly in Moscow and Kiev. Her time in Russia contributed to the formation of her literary talent as she studied at the Moscow Polish University, learned foreign languages, and became interested in music and theater. In Russia, she acquired knowledge about the work of Scriabin, who later became her favorite composer and whose music she would promote in Poland by organizing his concerts in Warsaw.

Marriage 

On 12 September 1922, after overcoming the initial resistance of her father, she married poet Jarosław Iwaszkiewicz. For this marriage, she broke off an engagement to Prince Krzysztof Radziwiłł, arranged several years earlier. Through her marriage she gained the opportunity to establish contacts with the artistic and literary community.

She gave birth to daughters: Maria and Teresa.

Literary activity 

Anna published essays, mainly on the works of Marcel Proust, Joseph Conrad and Thomas Mann (partly under a pseudonym). She translated French literature (Marcel Proust, Michel Butor, Alain-Fournier, Jules Verne) and English-language literature (Thomas Marton and Alfred North Whitehead). At the end of her life, she published the book Nasze zwierzęta (Our Animals) (1978). Her most outstanding work is Dzienniki i wspomnienia (Diaries and Memoirs) (published in 2000), containing valuable descriptions of life in the interwar period and memories of, among others, Karol Szymanowski, a relative of her husband.

Personality 

Anna was a sensitive and difficult person.

Her husband did not hide his sexual orientation or male lovers from her, while Anna herself was bisexual. Nonetheless, the couple considered their marriage happy and successful.

Anna had mental health issues, including depression. She coped with it by being a devoted Catholic. Anna wrote for journals for many years, which demonstrate her literary talent and personality.

During the German occupation, she helped Polish Jews by organizing their escape from the Ghetto and hiding them in Stawisko. For this activity, on 21 January 1988, she and her husband were honored with the award of Righteous Among the Nations.

References 

1897 births
1979 deaths
20th-century Polish women writers
Polish LGBT writers
Polish bisexual people
Polish memoirists
Polish translators
Polish Righteous Among the Nations
Bisexual women
20th-century memoirists
20th-century translators
20th-century Polish LGBT people